Kinder Farm Park is a park located in rural Millersvile, Anne Arundel County, Maryland, United States. The park contains  and is operated by Anne Arundel County Recreation and Parks. It is open year-round. Organizations using the park include the Friends of Kinder Farm Park and the Kinder Farm Park 4H Livestock Club.

History
The park is named after the Kinder family, who once ran the farm that now exists within the park. The family made its first land purchases within Anne Arundel County in 1892, and at their peak owned 1,100 acres of farmland within the county. In the decades that followed World War II, the family slowly began selling off pieces of the land for residential development. In 1979, they decided to sell the remaining 288 acres to Anne Arundel County on the condition that the land be used as a park. They did this because they wanted to preserve the farm's history and provide an open space in an area that was becoming more and more developed.

See also
 Downs Park
 Fort Smallwood Park
 Quiet Waters Park

References

Parks in Anne Arundel County, Maryland
Protected areas established in 1979
1979 establishments in Maryland